GURPS Bunnies & Burrows is a sourcebook for GURPS. The Bunnies & Burrows game was modified by Steffan O'Sullivan and republished by Steve Jackson Games as an official GURPS supplement in 1992.

Contents
GURPS Bunnies & Burrows adapted the GURPS rules to support playing with rabbits. GURPS Bunnies & Burrows uses the GURPS system common in all GURPS products. Steffan O'Sullivan, who wrote GURPS Bunnies & Burrows notes, "The game has also been published as a GURPS supplement, but I usually play it in Fudge these days - the simpler rules seem to work better for this genre in particular. I've also run it in Sherpa, which is oddly evocative of the original rules."

Publication history
During a rise of "retro" games in the late 1980s and early 1990s, Steve Jackson Games entered negotiations with Dennis Sustare and Scott Robinson, the current owners of the Bunnies & Burrows copyright, to publish an official GURPS supplement. In 1988, Steffan O'Sullivan wrote an unofficial conversion of Bunnies & Burrows to GURPS while the negotiations continued. He indicated that he hoped to one day work on the official supplement.

GURPS Bunnies & Burrows was published in 1992. It was written by O'Sullivan with interior art by Jim Groat. GURPS Bunnies & Burrows was the first game world that Steve Jackson Games adapted to the universal GURPS system in the early 1990s. The book is now out of print, but (as of July 2015) is still available via digital download. Loyd Blankenship, the managing editor of Steve Jackson Games' former Illuminati BBS acknowledged that O'Sullivan received his wish, and kept the original conversion article online. Steve Jackson Games continues to support the game, releasing an updated errata sheet in 2007.

Reception
Lev Lafayette says that it is "really hard to fault GURPS Bunnies & Burrows", as it is educational, realistic, whimsical and clever, while the game has also been described as a "work of genius".

Reviewed in White Wolf #35.

References

Fantasy role-playing game supplements
Bunnies & Barrows
Role-playing game supplements introduced in 1992